Knut Fleckenstein (born 20 December 1953) is a German politician and former Member of the European Parliament (MEP) from Germany. He is a member of the Social Democratic Party of Germany, part of the Party of European Socialists.

He was elected to the European Parliament in 2009, prior to which he had managed the Workers' Samaritan Federation in Hamburg.

Since July 2020, he serves as an official adviser to the speaker of Albania's parliament, Gramoz Ruci.

Member of the European Parliament, 2009–2019
Between 2009 and 2014, Fleckenstein served on the Committee on Transport and Tourism. From 2014, he was member of the Committee on Foreign Affairs (AFET). In addition, he served on the delegation to the EU-Russia Parliamentary Cooperation Committee since 2009. He was the Parliament's rapporteur on market access to port services and financial transparency.

In addition to his committee assignments, Fleckenstein was a member of the European Parliament Intergroup on the Welfare and Conservation of Animals

Within the parliamentary group of the Progressive Alliance of Socialists and Democrats, Fleckenstein served as vice-president responsible for foreign policy, human rights, trade and development.

Other activities
 European Endowment for Democracy (EED), Member of the Board of Governors
 Ernst Deutsch Theater, Chairman of the Supervisory Board
 Europa-Kolleg Hamburg, Member of the Board of Trustees
 Hamburgische Regenbogenstiftung, Member of the Board of Trustees
 BERTINI Award, Chairman of the Board of Directors (since 2007)
 Samaritan International, President

Political positions
In his capacity as vice-chair of the Progressive Alliance of Socialists and Democrats, Fleckenstein called in August 2015 for a “new initiative for political dialogue in Europe” after the annexation of Crimea by the Russian Federation and the removal “from the sanction lists of both Russia and the European Union all members of national Parliaments as well as the European Parliament.” His call also targeted the EU sanctions list, which imposed visa bans and asset freezes on 151 people in Russia, including dozens of members of the State Duma, the lower house of the Russian parliament.

References

1953 births
Living people
People from Bad Nauheim
Social Democratic Party of Germany MEPs
MEPs for Germany 2009–2014
MEPs for Germany 2014–2019
Articles containing video clips